The 1973 Dwars door België was the 28th edition of the Dwars door Vlaanderen cycle race and was held on 25 March 1973. The race started and finished in Waregem. The race was won by Roger Loysch.

General classification

References

1973
1973 in road cycling
1973 in Belgian sport